Tomás Carbonell and Francisco Roig were the defending champions but lost in the semifinals to Joshua Eagle and Andrew Florent.

Emanuel Couto and Bernardo Mota won in the final 4–6, 6–4, 6–4 against Eagle and Florent.

Seeds
Champion seeds are indicated in bold text while text in italics indicates the round in which those seeds were eliminated.

 Libor Pimek /  Byron Talbot (semifinals)
 Tomás Carbonell /  Francisco Roig (semifinals)
 David Adams /  Menno Oosting (first round)
 Joshua Eagle /  Andrew Florent (final)

Draw

References
 1996 Oporto Open Doubles Draw

Doubles
Doubles
1996 in Portuguese tennis